Murtha is a surname. Notable people with the surname include:

Andrew Murtha (born 1965), Australian speed skater
John Murtha (1932–2010), member of the United States Congress
John Garvan Murtha (born 1941), United States federal judge
John Murtha (Wisconsin politician) (born 1951), Wisconsin state assemblyman
Lydon Murtha (born 1985), American football player
William H. Murtha (1841–1891), merchant and New York politician
Tish Murtha (1956–2013), documentary photographer

See also
Johnstown–Cambria County Airport, an airport named after the congressman
USS John P. Murtha (LPD-26), a US Navy ship named after the congressman
Murtagh